Adventure Ltd. is a 1935 British adventure film directed by George King and starring Harry Milton, Pearl Argyle and Sebastian Shaw. It was made at Elstree Studios as a quota quickie for release by Paramount Pictures.

Cast
 Harry Milton as Kim Berkeley  
 Pearl Argyle as Anita Lorenzo  
 Sebastian Shaw as Bruce Blandford  
 Sam Wilkinson as Reginald Purdie 
 Clifford Heatherley as Sir Matthew Muller  
 Hugh E. Wright as Don Lorenzo / Montagu Phelps  
 Laurence Hanray as Simon Ledbury  
 Cecil Humphreys as General Baroda

References

Bibliography
 Chibnall, Steve. Quota Quickies: The Birth of the British 'B' Film. British Film Institute, 2007.
 Low, Rachael. Filmmaking in 1930s Britain. George Allen & Unwin, 1985.
 Wood, Linda. British Films, 1927-1939. British Film Institute, 1986.

External links

1935 films
British adventure films
1935 adventure films
Films directed by George King
Quota quickies
British and Dominions Studios films
Films shot at Imperial Studios, Elstree
British black-and-white films
1930s English-language films
1930s British films